Equivalence theorem may refer to:

Economics
 Ricardian equivalence, a principle in economics
 Revenue equivalence, a concept in auction theory

Mathematics and physics
 Compass equivalence theorem, a theorem in straightedge and compass construction
 Equivalence principle, in general relativity
 Lax equivalence theorem, a theorem in the analysis of finite difference methods
 Optical equivalence theorem, a theorem in quantum optics
 Surface equivalence principle, a principle in electromagnetism and antenna theory

Science disambiguation pages